Lilo & Stitch is a 2002 American animated science fiction comedy-drama film produced by Walt Disney Feature Animation and released by Walt Disney Pictures. The 42nd Disney animated feature film, it was written and directed by Chris Sanders and Dean DeBlois (in their directorial debuts) and produced by Clark Spencer. It features Daveigh Chase and Sanders as the voices of the title characters, and also features the voices of Tia Carrere, David Ogden Stiers, Kevin McDonald, Ving Rhames, Jason Scott Lee, and Kevin Michael Richardson. It was the second of three Disney animated feature films (the first being Mulan, and the third Brother Bear) produced primarily at the Florida animation studio in Disney's Hollywood Studios (named "Disney-MGM Studios" during its production) at Walt Disney World near Orlando, Florida.

The film's story revolves around two individuals: a Hawaiian girl named Lilo Pelekai, who is raised by her older sister Nani after their parents' deaths, and the extraterrestrial creature Experiment 626, who is adopted by Lilo as her "dog" and renamed "Stitch". Stitch, who was genetically engineered to cause chaos and destruction, initially uses Lilo to avoid recapture by the intergalactic federation, but they develop a close bond through the Hawaiian concept of ohana, or extended family, causing Stitch to reconsider his intended destructive purpose in order to keep his newfound family together.

The film is based on an idea by Sanders, who originally conceived the character Stitch in the 1980s, and the film's design and aesthetics are based on his  personal art style. Lilo & Stitch premiered at the El Capitan Theatre in Los Angeles on June 16, 2002, and was released worldwide on June 21. The film received positive reviews from critics, who praised its humor, charm, and originality. Produced on an $80 million budget and promoted with a marketing campaign that played up its oddities, it was a box-office success, grossing over $273 million worldwide. It was nominated for Best Animated Feature at the 75th Academy Awards. The film's critical and commercial success made it one of Disney Animation's few great successes during its post-Renaissance era in the 2000s, spawning a franchise that includes three direct-to-video sequels, starting with Stitch! The Movie, and three television series, including the sequel series Lilo & Stitch: The Series and spin-offs Stitch! and Stitch & Ai. A live-action adaptation is reportedly in development.

Plot

The Galactic Federation arrests Dr. Jumba Jookiba for illegal genetic experimentation, having created Experiment 626. Before the experiment's sentencing and punishment, it escapes and crash-lands on Kauai, Hawaii. The Federation assigns Agent Wendy Pleakley, the council's Earth expert, to capture the experiment, with Jumba helping in exchange for his release from prison.

On the island, Nani Pelekai struggles to take care of her rambunctious but lonely younger sister, Lilo, after their parents died in a car crash. Social worker Cobra Bubbles expresses concern about whether Nani can take adequate care of Lilo. Since Lilo's hula classmates have ostracized her, Nani decides to let her adopt a dog. At the animal shelter, Lilo takes interest in 626, who impersonates a dog to avoid Jumba and Pleakley, who have already landed on Earth. Despite Nani's doubts, Lilo adopts 626 and renames him "Stitch". That evening, at the restaurant where Nani works, Jumba and Pleakley attempt to capture Stitch while in disguise. The owner blames the ensuing destructive chaos on Stitch and fires Nani. The next day, Bubbles warns Nani that he will have to place Lilo with a foster family if she doesn't find another job. Stitch's antics while evading his two pursuers persistently ruin Nani's chances of finding work.

Nani's friend David Kawena invites her, Lilo, and Stitch to enjoy a day of surfing and beach fun. While Nani, Lilo, and Stitch ride a huge wave, Jumba and Pleakley try to capture Stitch, causing Stitch to unintentionally pull Lilo underwater. They survive, but Bubbles witnesses this event and tells Nani that, although she means well, it means that Lilo will have to be taken away if Nani doesn't find another job. Feeling guilty over how much trouble he has caused, Stitch runs off into the night. The next morning, the Grand Councilwoman fires Jumba and Pleakley and gives the assignment to Captain Gantu, incidentally freeing them both to pursue Stitch using less covert methods. Meanwhile, David informs Nani of a job opportunity, which she rushes off to pursue. Hiding in the nearby woods, Stitch encounters Jumba and Pleakley, who chase him back to Nani's house. A fight ensues, throwing the house into chaos and causing an explosion that damages it. Nani sees the chaos and rushes back home to see Bubbles arrive to collect Lilo.

As Nani and Bubbles get into a falling out, Lilo runs away into the woods and finds Stitch, who, in shame, reveals his alien identity before Gantu captures them. Stitch escapes from Gantu's ship but fails to rescue Lilo. Nani confronts him, having witnessed Lilo's kidnapping. Before he can explain, Jumba and Pleakley capture Stitch themselves. Nani demands that they help her rescue Lilo, but Jumba and Pleakley insist they only came for Stitch. When Nani breaks down, Stitch reminds her about ohana, a term for "family" he learned from her. Stitch convinces Jumba to help rescue Lilo. Jumba, Pleakley, Stitch, and Nani board Jumba's personal spaceship and chase after Gantu, rescuing Lilo. 

Back on the shore, the Grand Councilwoman arrives on Earth preparing to take Stitch into custody, along with Bubbles, who catches up to take Lilo away. She fires Gantu for failing to capture Stitch, and for putting Lilo in danger, and blames Jumba for the mess. Before Stitch goes into the spaceship, he asks the Councilwoman to say goodbye to his new family. Lilo then insists that, because she paid for Stitch at the shelter and has a stamped receipt to show for it, Stitch is her pet under local law, and if the Councilwoman took him away, it would be theft. Impressed with Stitch's newfound civility and empathy, the Councilwoman decrees that Stitch will live in exile on Earth, entrusted to Lilo and Nani's care, and that the family will be under the care of the Galactic Federation and Bubbles, a former CIA agent who knew the Councilwoman during the Roswell incident. Lilo, Nani, and their newfound friends rebuild their house, and Jumba and Pleakley become members of Nani, Lilo, and Stitch's family.

Voice cast

 Daveigh Chase as Lilo Pelekai, an eccentric young Hawaiian girl on the island of Kaua'i who adopts Stitch as her pet dog. Andreas Deja served as the supervising animator for Lilo Pelekai.
 Chris Sanders as Stitch/Experiment 626, a blue koala-like illegal genetic experiment with the ability to create untold chaos. Alex Kupershmidt served as the supervising animator for Stitch.
 Tia Carrere as Nani Pelekai, Lilo's stressed-out older sister and legal guardian after the death of their parents in a car accident. Stephane Sainte-Foi served as the supervising animator for Nani Pelekai.
 David Ogden Stiers as Dr. Jumba Jookiba, a Kweltikwan mad scientist employed by Galaxy Defense Industries who created Stitch. Bolhem Bouchiba served as the supervising animator for Dr. Jumba Jookiba.
 Kevin McDonald as Agent Wendy Pleakley, a Plorgonarian Galactic Federation agent who acts as the expert of Earth. Ruben A. Aquino served as the supervising animator for Pleakley.
 Ving Rhames as Cobra Bubbles, a former CIA agent once involved in a Roswell UFO incident who is assigned as a social worker for Lilo. Byron Howard served as the supervising animator for Cobra Bubbles.
 Kevin Michael Richardson as Captain Gantu, the respected but arrogant Shaelik second-in-command of the Galactic Federation.
 Zoe Caldwell as the Grand Councilwoman, the Grey leader of the Galactic Federation.
 Jason Scott Lee as David Kawena, Nani's hapless surfer friend and love interest. Ruben A. Aquino served as the supervising animator for David.
 Miranda Paige Walls as Mertle Edmonds, Lilo's classmate from their hālau hula who despises and derides her.
 Kunewa Mook as Moses Puloki, Lilo's hula teacher.
 Amy Hill as Mrs. Hasagawa, an elderly woman who runs a fruit stand.
 Susan Hegarty as Rescue Lady, who runs the animal shelter where Lilo adopts Stitch.

Production

Development

Production of Lilo & Stitch began with then-Disney CEO Michael Eisner deciding that, in the wake of a number of high-profile and large-budget Disney animated features during the mid-1990s, the studio might try its hand at a smaller and less expensive film. The idea was inspired by the production of Dumbo, an economically-made 1941 Walt Disney film produced in the wake of the more expensive Pinocchio and Fantasia. Chris Sanders, a head storyboard artist at Disney Feature Animation, was approached to pitch an idea. Sanders had created the character of Stitch in 1985 for an unsuccessful children's book pitch and had to now develop a concept that featured the character in an animated film. The storyline required a remote, non-urban location, so the movie was originally intended to take place in Kansas. Sanders's decision to change the film's setting to the Hawaiian island of Kauai was an important choice in defining the plot more clearly. No other animated feature had ever taken place on any of the Hawaiian islands before. In Sanders's words:

Writing
Dean DeBlois, who had served as "story co-head" in Mulan (1998), was brought on to co-write and co-direct Lilo & Stitch, while Disney executive Clark Spencer was assigned to produce. Unlike several previous and concurrent Disney Feature Animation productions, the film's pre-production team remained relatively small and isolated from upper management until the film went into full production. The character and set designs were based upon Sanders's personal artistic style.

While the animation team visited Kauai to research the locale, their tour guide explained the meaning of ohana as it applies to extended families. This concept of ohana became an important part of the movie. DeBlois recalls:

The island of Kauai had also been featured in such films as Raiders of the Lost Ark, and those from the Jurassic Park trilogy. The Disney animators faced the daunting task of meshing the film's plot, which showed the impoverished and dysfunctional life that many Hawaiians lived during the then-recent economic downturn, with the island's serene beauty. The actors voicing the film's young adults, Nani and David, were Tia Carrere, a local of Honolulu, and Jason Scott Lee, who is of Hawaiian descent and was raised in Hawaii. The voice actors assisted with rewriting the Hawaiian characters' dialogue in the proper colloquial dialect, and also with the task of adding Hawaiian slang terms.

One innovative and unique aspect of the film is its strong focus on the relationship between two sisters: Lilo and Nani. Making the relationship between sisters into a major plot element is very rare in American animated films.

Design and animation
In a deviation from several decades' worth of Disney features, Sanders and DeBlois chose to use watercolor painted backgrounds for Lilo & Stitch, as opposed to the traditional gouache technique. While watercolors had been used for the early Disney animated shorts, as well as the early Disney features Snow White and the Seven Dwarfs (1937), Pinocchio (1940), and Dumbo (1941), the technique had been largely abandoned by the mid-1940s in favor of less complicated media such as gouache. Sanders preferred that watercolors be used for Lilo & Stitch to evoke both the bright look of a storybook and the art direction of Dumbo, requiring the background artists to be trained in working with the medium.

The animation itself was all based on 2D work as the budget lacked funds to incorporate computer generated imagery. The character designs were based around Sanders's personal drawing style, eschewing the traditional Disney house style. Because of the limited budget, details like pockets or designs on clothing were avoided in the animation process, and as they could not afford to do shadows throughout much of the film, many of the scenes took place in shaded areas, saving the use of shadows for more pivotal scenes.

The film's extraterrestrial elements, such as the spaceships, were designed to resemble marine life, such as whales and crabs. One planned scene in the film involved Nani, Pleakley and Jumba hijacking a Boeing 747 airliner and piloting it in a cartoonish manner through a city. However, following the September 11 attacks with only a few weeks left in production, this scene was revamped at a large cost to have them use Jumba and Pleakley's alien craft instead, revamping the airliner's design to look like an alien spacecraft, though the final design still has engines that resembled the 747's jet engines, according to Sanders.

Even after this adjustment, the team had enough budget for about two additional minutes of animation, which was used to create the epilogue montage of Lilo, Nani, and Stitch becoming a new family.

Marketing
Teaser trailers for the film parody trailers for other Disney films (three of which Sanders previously worked on) from the Disney Renaissance: Beauty and the Beast, Aladdin, The Little Mermaid  and The Lion King. These are called "Inter-Stitch-als" and are featured on Disney's official site as well as on the film's respective DVD release. The original actors were brought back to reprise their roles (with the exception of Timon from The Lion King, who was voiced by Kevin Schon) and were shocked when asked to act negatively towards Stitch. The trailers also include the AC/DC song track "Back in Black." In the United Kingdom, Lilo & Stitch trailers and TV ads featured a cover of Elvis' song "Suspicious Minds", performed by Gareth Gates, who became famous on the UK TV program Pop Idol. In the US, "Hound Dog" was used for both theatrical and TV trailers. The marketing campaign presented Stitch as the sort of "Disney Family Black Sheep". As a promotional campaign, comics of Lilo & Stitch were run in Disney Adventures prior to the film's release. The comics detailed events leading up to the film for both title characters, including the creation and escape of Stitch. These events were later contradicted by the sequel Lilo & Stitch 2: Stitch Has a Glitch, rendering the comics non-canonical, but is notable to the series as introducing Experiment 625, Reuben, who was made a main character in the subsequent movies and TV series. Most of the comic series have been released as a collective volume titled Comic Zone Volume 1: Lilo & Stitch.

Deleted scenes
Several major elements of the film changed during production. Originally, Stitch was the leader of an intergalactic gang, and Jumba was one of his former cronies summoned by the Intergalactic Council to capture Stitch. Test audience response to early versions of the film resulted in the change of Stitch and Jumba's relationship to that of creation and creator, respectively.

The biggest change came to the film's third act, which had Stitch, Nani, Jumba, and Pleakley hijacking a Boeing 747 jet from Lihue Airport to save Lilo; the scene had the quartet chasing Gantu through downtown Honolulu, scraping against buildings and coming dangerously close to the ground. After the terrorist attacks occurred on the World Trade Center and The Pentagon on September 11, 2001, the film's climax was completely reworked so that they instead flew Jumba's spaceship through the mountains of Kauai. This revision was done primarily by replacing the CGI model of the 747 with that of Jumba's spaceship, with only a few shots in the sequence fully re-animated.

Another scene that was deleted was one of Lilo's attempts to make Stitch into a model citizen by notifying tourists on the beach about the tsunami warning sirens, which she knows are being tested that day. The original version of Jumba attacking Stitch in Lilo's home was found to be too violent by test audiences and was revised to make it more comedic. There was also a scene in which Lilo introduces Stitch to Pudge the fish, which ultimately leads to the fish's death. Lilo then takes Pudge's body to the same graveyard where her parents were buried, and thus Stitch learns the consequences of his actions and gains a better understanding of mortality.

A scene was removed where Nani brings Lilo pizza and then Lilo tells herself a bedtime story about a friendly and stinky bear named Toaster. It was replaced with the scene where Lilo and Nani talk about being family because test audiences had mistaken Nani for Lilo's mother. The trial scene originally had Stitch as the defendant, and Jumba is not present. Instead, Jumba was going to be introduced in the scene where the Grand Councilwoman takes Pleakley to see him at the prison. This was changed because the film directors thought the Intergalactic Council had to blame him for creating Stitch.

Release
The film premiered at the El Capitan Theatre on June 16, 2002.

Box office
Lilo & Stitch opened in second place with $35.3 million in its first weekend, less than $500,000 behind Minority Report. In its second week, it fell to third, again behind the Steven Spielberg film coming in second after Mr. Deeds. As soon as Men in Black II was released, Lilo & Stitch stayed in third place. Despite this, the film continued to draw in families while other major summer blockbusters like Spider-Man and Star Wars: Episode II – Attack of the Clones ruled the box office. Additionally, it would go on to compete against the Warner Bros. live-action/computer-animated hybrid film Scooby-Doo. The film earned $145.8 million in the United States and Canada, and $127.3 million internationally, totaling $273.1 million globally. It was the second-highest-grossing animated film of 2002, behind 20th Century Fox's Ice Age. They were the only two animated films to approach the $100 million mark that year. Box Office Mojo estimates that the film sold over 25 million tickets during its original run.

Critical reception
The site's critics consensus reads, "Edgier than traditional Disney fare, Lilo and Stitch explores issues of family while providing a fun and charming story." Metacritic assigned the film a weighted average score of 73 out of 100, based on 30 critics, indicating "generally favorable reviews". Audiences polled by CinemaScore gave the film an average grade of "A" on an A+ to F scale.

Roger Ebert of the Chicago Sun-Times gave the film 3.5 stars out of 4 and wrote "It's one of the most charming feature-length cartoons of recent years—funny, sassy, startling, original and with six songs by Elvis". The film's success spawned a Lilo & Stitch franchise, with three sequel films and three television series. This film has more Elvis Presley performed songs in it than any other film, including films that Presley himself was in.

Peter M. Nichols states that through the character of Nani and her struggles, the film appeals to older children better than such attempts by the studio to do so as The Emperor's New Groove, Atlantis: The Lost Empire, and Treasure Planet.

Home media
Lilo & Stitch was released on VHS and DVD on December 3, 2002. During the first day of release, more than 3 million DVD copies were sold. This THX certified DVD release features a variety of bonus features, such as a Build An Alien Experiment game, an audio commentary, music videos, deleted scenes, teaser trailers, and DVD-ROM. In 2003, a 2-disc DVD version was announced to come out along with Alice in Wonderland (1951) and Pocahontas (1995), which were released in 2004 and 2005. A 2-Disc Special Edition DVD of Lilo & Stitch was released in the UK on August 22, 2005, along with the UK release of Lilo & Stitch 2: Stitch Has a Glitch (2005), but a release in the US was affected by many delays. On March 24, 2009, Disney finally released the special edition DVD, which is called a 2-Disc "Big Wave Edition". This new DVD has everything that the original DVD had and adds an audio commentary, a 2-hour documentary, more deleted scenes, a number of behind-the-scenes featurettes, and some games. On June 11, 2013, Lilo & Stitch was released on Blu-ray and re-released on DVD alongside Lilo & Stitch 2 in a "2-Movie Collection", which included a single Blu-ray with both films but without bonus features, a reprint of disc one of the "Big Wave Edition" DVD, and a reprint of the Lilo & Stitch 2 DVD. The "2-Movie Collection" has since seen two re-releases; one on January 31, 2017, containing only the Blu-ray and a code to redeem a digital download of the two films, and another on August 9, 2022, which places both films on separate Blu-ray discs that also contain most of their original DVD bonus features, the two DVDs from the first Blu-ray collection, and a digital download code as with the second Blu-ray collection.

Altered scene
A scene was modified for the UK home video release. In the original, Lilo hid in a clothes dryer, which was changed to a commode with a cabinet and pizza box used as a "door" to avoid influencing children to hide in dryers. The UK edit was later used for the film's Disney+ release and the 2022 Blu-ray release.

Soundtrack

Lilo & Stitch: An Original Walt Disney Records Soundtrack is the soundtrack to Disney's 2002 animated feature Lilo & Stitch. It contains two original songs from the film written by Mark Kealiʻi Hoʻomalu and Alan Silvestri (the film's composer), and performed by Kealiʻi Hoʻomalu and the Kamehameha Schools children's chorus. It also contains five songs by American singer Elvis Presley, and three of his songs re-recorded by American singer Wynonna ("Burning Love"), British singer Gareth Gates ("Suspicious Minds", UK release) and Swedish group A-Teens and Taiwanese group F4 ("Can't Help Falling in Love"). It was released by Walt Disney Records on June 11, 2002, on Audio CD and Compact Cassette. On June 23, 2003, the soundtrack album was certified Platinum by the Recording Industry Association of America for sales of 1 million units.

Track listing

Charts

Weekly charts

Year-end charts

Certifications

Other media

Sequels, TV shows, and franchise

On August 26, 2003, Disney released a direct-to-video sequel, Stitch! The Movie, which served as the pilot to a television series titled Lilo & Stitch: The Series. This series ran for 65 episodes between September 20, 2003, and July 29, 2006. The series carried on where the film left off and charted Lilo and Stitch's efforts to capture and rehabilitate Jumba's remaining experiments. The series, as well as the original parts of the franchise that focused on Lilo Pelekai and were set in Hawaii, ended with the television film Leroy & Stitch, which aired on June 23, 2006.

On August 30, 2005, Lilo & Stitch 2: Stitch Has a Glitch, another direct-to-video sequel to the film, was released. In this film (set between Lilo & Stitch and Stitch! The Movie), Stitch has a glitch because his molecules were never fully charged (this is contrary to an original opening, "Stitch's trial", which was seen on the DVD release of Lilo & Stitch). Lilo wants to win the May Day hula contest like her mother did in the 1970s, but Stitch continues to have outbursts. Lilo gets increasingly mad at Stitch as his glitch causes more problems for her and ruins her chances of winning the competition. She thinks Stitch is not cooperating properly, until she finds out that Stitch is dying. The Lilo & Stitch 2: Stitch Has a Glitch DVD also contained a short film, The Origin of Stitch, that served as a bridge between Stitch Has a Glitch and Stitch! The Movie.

In March 2008, Disney announced an anime based on the Lilo & Stitch franchise aimed at the Japanese market titled Stitch!. The anime, which ran as a series from October 2008 to March 2011, features a Japanese girl named Yuna Kamihara in place of Lilo, and is set on a fictional island in Okinawa Prefecture instead of Hawaii. This series was produced by Madhouse for its first two seasons, and Shin-Ei Animation for its third season and two post-series specials in 2012 and 2015.

From March 27 to April 6, 2017, an English-language Chinese animated television series based on the franchise titled Stitch & Ai aired in China with a Mandarin Chinese dub. It was produced by Anhui Xinhua Media and Panimation Hwakai Media. Like with the Stitch! anime, it features a local girl named Wang Ai Ling instead of Lilo, and is set in the Huangshan mountains. Unlike Stitch!, however, this series was originally produced in English in co-operation with American animators (including those who worked on Lilo & Stitch: The Series) and then dubbed into Mandarin Chinese; the original English production aired in Southeast Asia during February 2018.

Live-action adaptation
In October 2018, The Hollywood Reporter reported that Walt Disney Pictures was developing a live-action remake of Lilo & Stitch to be produced by Aladdin producers Dan Lin and Jonathan Eirich and written by Mike Van Waes. In November 2020, it was reported that Jon M. Chu entered talks to direct the film and that it was unclear if the film would be released in theaters or on Disney+. In July 2022, Dean Fleischer Camp replaced Chu as the film's director. In February 2023, Zach Galifianakis joined the film as Pleakley.

Video games
There were three official games released in 2002 to coincide with the film: Disney's Lilo & Stitch: Trouble in Paradise for PlayStation and Microsoft Windows, Disney's Lilo & Stitch for Game Boy Advance, and Disney's Stitch: Experiment 626 for PlayStation 2. Stitch is also a summonable character in Kingdom Hearts II and III, and appears along with his homeworld in Kingdom Hearts Birth by Sleep for the PlayStation Portable. Lilo and Stitch both appear in the Nintendo 3DS game Disney Magical World and its sequel. Stitch is also a playable character in the Disney Infinity series in the second game, Disney Infinity: Marvel Super Heroes, and the series' third and final game, Disney Infinity 3.0. He was also a meet and greet character in Kinect: Disneyland Adventures. Some characters of the film are playable characters in the game Disney Magic Kingdoms. Stitch also appears as a playable character in the mobile game Disney Mirrorverse for IOS and Android devices.

See also

 List of films featuring extraterrestrials

Notes

References

External links

 
 
 
 
 
 

Lilo & Stitch (franchise)
2000s American animated films
2000s science fiction comedy films
2000s children's animated films
2002 animated films
2002 comedy-drama films
2002 directorial debut films
2002 films
2002 science fiction films
2000s English-language films
2000s buddy comedy films
American children's animated comic science fiction films
American children's animated comedy films
American children's animated drama films
American comedy-drama films
American surfing films
Animated drama films
Animated buddy films
Animated duos
Animated films about extraterrestrial life
Animated films about friendship
Animated films about orphans
Animated films about sisters
Children's comedy-drama films
Annie Award winners
Fictional duos
Animated films about children
Films about dysfunctional families
Animated films about families
Films about pets
Films adapted into comics
Films adapted into television shows
Films directed by Chris Sanders
Films directed by Dean DeBlois
Films produced by Clark Spencer
Films scored by Alan Silvestri
Films set in Hawaii
Films with screenplays by Chris Sanders
Films with screenplays by Dean DeBlois
Impact of the September 11 attacks on cinema
Walt Disney Animation Studios films
Walt Disney Pictures animated films